Jarry may refer to:

Places
Jarry station, a station of the Montreal Metro (subway), Canada
Jarry Street, a street in Montreal

People with the surname
 Alfred Jarry (1873–1907), French writer
 Gérard Jarry (1936–2004), French violinist
 Isabelle Jarry (born 1959), French writer
 Nicolás Jarry, Chilean tennis player
 Nicolas Jarry (calligrapher) (1620–1674), French calligrapher
 Rachel Jarry (born 1991), Australian basketball player
 Raoul Jarry (1885-1930), Canadian politician and City Councillor in Montreal, Quebec
 Tristan Jarry, (born 1995), Canadian ice hockey goaltender for the Pittsburgh Penguins

See also
 Jari (disambiguation)
 Z.I. Jarry, a commercial/light-industrial suburb of Pointe-à-Pitre, Guadeloupe
 Jarry Park, an urban park in Montreal, Canada
 Jarry Park Stadium, a former baseball stadium in Montreal, Canada